Olathe North High School is a public high school located in Olathe, Kansas, United States, serving students in grades 9-12. The school is one of five high schools in the Olathe USD 233 school district. The school colors are red and royal blue and the mascot is the Eagle.

Olathe North is a member of the Kansas State High School Activities Association and offers a variety of sports programs. Athletic teams compete in the 6A division and are known as the "Eagles". Extracurricular activities are also offered in the form of performing arts, school publications, and clubs.

History
Olathe North is the oldest of five high schools in Olathe, Kansas. The school was founded in 1883 as Olathe High School. The school moved to its current location in 1958 and changed its name to Olathe North High School in 1981.  The mascot, school colors, and fight song of Olathe High were retained for Olathe North.

Changes through the years
The most recent addition includes a second floor added in order to make room for the admittance of freshmen to the school in the 2010–11 school year. Other recent updates include the 21st century classrooms, which are  home to the school's nationally renowned 21st Century academies. They offer classes such as Life Sciences, Geosciences, Animal Health, Culinary Arts, Engineering, Video Game Design/Animation, Distinguished Scholars and Sports Medicine. Students across the district apply to get spots in these programs, with around 25-50 students accepted annually in each program. Students accepted into these programs transfer to North as full-time students there. Many of these programs have curriculums written by the instructors. In addition to biology labs and replica doctor's offices for the study of sports medicine, North's 21st century wing includes a professional quality animation studio and news broadcasting station, which brings the school daily news reports and 2 TV stations. In addition, the Distinguished Scholar program offers students individualized lesson plans in the discipline of their choice. Distinguished Scholar areas include visual arts, political science, science, language arts, and math.

Programs and Education
Olathe North hosts five different 21st century academies. These are programs developed by the Olathe School District to give students the ability to develop specific skills and interests. The five programs Olathe North hosts are Animal Health, Geoscience, Medical Professions, Sports Medicine, and Distinguished Scholars.

Extracurricular activities
The Eagles compete in the Sunflower League and are classified as a 6A school, the largest classification in Kansas according to the Kansas State High School Activities Association. Throughout its history, Olathe North has won thirteen state championships in various sports.

Athletics

Football
Olathe North has won eight Kansas 6A State Championships (1996, 1997, 1998, 2000, 2001, 2002, 2003 and 2009) in football under the coaching of Gene Weir, John McCall and Pete Flood.  Despite the success, Olathe North football has endured four coaching changes in the last six years. McCall became the head coach in 2003, when Weir took the football head coaching position at Richland High School in Texas. After leading the Eagles for two years, McCall accepted an assistant coaching position on Wier's staff. David Bassore was announced head coach in 2005 and led the Eagles to a 6–5 record and a district championship. In March 2006, just two weeks after announcing his resignation as head coach, Bassore died in a car accident. Pete Flood took the reins in 2006, and guided the Eagles to a 10–2 record in 2007.  The Eagles were one game away from the state championship, only to lose to Olathe South at sub-state. The 2007 version of the Eagles was led by a strong senior class, including John Chmiel, and quarterback Jake Catloth. The 2009 Eagles won the 6A state championship on Saturday, November 28, 2009, vs. Wichita Heights. November 27, 2010, Olathe North played Wichita Heights at State losing. Now the Eagles are led by their new head coach, Chris McCartney, who has been an Eagle for nearly twenty years. McCartney started as a defensive coordinator, but later gained leadership of the team. For his first year head coaching, in 2015, he led the Eagles to one game away from state, but they fell to the Blue Valley High School, going 10-2 for the season.

State championships

Non-athletic activities

The Olathe North Eaglette Drill/Dance Team
The Olathe North Eaglette Dance Team is the oldest drill team in the Olathe District. In 1996, the Eaglettes received 1st place at the American Dance/Drill Team National Championships, under the direction of Dalene Moomau.  The 2007-2008 Eaglettes traveled to Orlando, Florida for the National Dance Association National Championships for the first time ever. The team won 4th place in the Large Varsity Jazz Division for their routine to "Bingo Bango". The 2008-2009 Eaglettes are under the direction of Sara Heptig, with assistance by Lisa Claudel and Jessica Brown.

Band
In October 2011, the Screamin' Eagles won the title of overall "Grand Champion" at the Missouri Western Marching Competition for the third year in a row. At the 2011 Heart of America Marching Festival, the band won "Grand Champion" status for the second year in a row, as well as Outstanding Music, Marching, and General Effect awards.  The Screamin' Eagles won the "Grand Champion" at the Kansas band masters association in October 2015.. In 2017, the Screamin' Eagles went to New York City to perform at Carnegie Hall.

Drama
Olathe North put on the productions of title of show, The Election, The Diary of Anne Frank in the 2016–2017 school year. The school has also performed the musicals Oklahoma! and The Addams Family, and The Sound of Music .

Notable alumni
Arland Bruce III, former NFL and CFL player
 Dick Hickock, executed murderer, made famous in Truman Capote's book In Cold Blood
 Kit Pellow, former professional baseball player for the Saltillo Saraperos of the Mexican League, and for the Yaquis de Ciudad Obregón in the Pacific Mexican League, former Kansas City Royals player
 Isaiah Simmons, linebacker for the Arizona Cardinals
 Marcel Spears Jr., linebacker for the Iowa State Cyclones and Cincinnati Bengals 
 Darren Sproles, former running back and kick/punt returner for the Philadelphia Eagles, former Kansas State All-American running back

See also
 List of high schools in Kansas
 List of unified school districts in Kansas
Other high schools in Olathe USD 233 school district
 Olathe East High School in Olathe
 Olathe Northwest High School in Olathe
 Olathe South High School in Olathe
 Olathe West High School in Olathe

References

External links
 
 Olathe USD 233 School District

Public high schools in Kansas
Educational institutions established in 1883
Education in Olathe, Kansas
Schools in Johnson County, Kansas
Buildings and structures in Olathe, Kansas
1883 establishments in Kansas